Dermatodini is a weevil tribe in the subfamily Entiminae.

Genera 
Antinia – Burakowskiella – Conaliophthalmus – Cratopoxenus – Decophthalmus – Dermatodes – Dermatoxenus – Dirambon – Eustalida – Heterostylus) – Homoeonychus – Metrioderus – Mroczkowskiella – Ochtarthrum – Phrystanus – Rhinosomphus – Saurophthalmus – Stigmatrachelus – Zyrcosa

References 

 Emden, F. van. 1936: Die Anordnung der Brachyderinae-Gattungen im Coleopterorum Catalogus. Stettiner Entomologische Zeitung, 97(1): 66-99

External links 

Entiminae
Beetle tribes